The International Conference on Computer-Aided Design (ICCAD) is a yearly conference about electronic design automation. From the start in 1982 until 2014 the conference was held in San Jose, California. It is sponsored by the IEEE Circuits and Systems Society, Computer-Aided Design Technical Committee (CANDE), the IEEE Council on Electronic Design Automation (CEDA), and SIGDA, and in cooperation with the IEEE Electron Devices Society and the IEEE Solid State Circuits Society.

Unlike the Design Automation Conference, Design Automation and Test in Europe (DATE), and Asia and South Pacific Design Automation Conference (ASP-DAC), ICCAD is primarily a technical conference, with only a small trade show component.

See also 
electronic design automation
EDA Software Category
Design Automation Conference
Asia and South Pacific Design Automation Conference
Design Automation and Test in Europe
Symposia on VLSI Technology and Circuits

External links 
Main web page for the ICCAD conference

References 

International conferences
IEEE conferences
Electronic design automation conferences
Recurring events established in 1980